"Sparkle in Her Eyes" is a single by Canadian country music artist Terry Carisse. Released in 1979, it was the first single from his album Story of the Year. The song reached number one on the RPM Country Tracks chart in Canada in February 1980.

Chart performance

References

1979 singles
Terry Carisse songs
1979 songs
Songs written by Terry Carisse